Jail Birds is a 1914 American silent short drama film directed by Sydney Ayres starring William Garwood, Jack Richardson, and Charlotte Burton.

Cast
 William Garwood as Robert MacFarlane, a young attorney
 Jack Richardson as Dick Patterson
 Charlotte Burton as Mrs. Patterson
 B. Reeves Eason as Attorney Bright
 Louise Lester as Mrs. Carson
 Vivian Rich as Audrey Austin
 Harry von Meter as Harry Dupree, a crook
 Thomas Gullifer as Judge O'Brien

External links

1914 films
1914 drama films
Silent American drama films
American silent short films
American black-and-white films
1914 short films
Films directed by Sydney Ayres
1910s American films